The 2009 Gastein Ladies was a women's tennis tournament played on outdoor clay courts. It was the 3rd edition of the Gastein Ladies, and was part of the WTA International tournaments of the 2009 WTA Tour. It was held in Bad Gastein, Austria, from 20 July until 26 July 2009. Andrea Petkovic won the singles title.

WTA entrants

Seeds

Seedings are based on the rankings of July 13, 2009.
Francesca Schiavone withdrew due to a back injury, so Shahar Peer became the No. 9 seed.

Other entrants
The following players received wildcards into the singles main draw

  Melanie Klaffner
  Yvonne Meusburger
  Tina Schiechtl

The following players received entry from the qualifying draw:
  Zuzana Ondrášková
  Lenka Juríková
  Sharon Fichman
  Carmen Klaschka

The following player received the lucky loser spot:
 Tereza Hladiková

Finals

Singles

 Andrea Petkovic defeated  Ioana Raluca Olaru, 6–2, 6–3
It was Petkovic's first title of her career.

Doubles

 Andrea Hlaváčková /  Lucie Hradecká defeated  Tatjana Malek /  Andrea Petkovic, 6–2, 6–4

External links
Official website

Gastein Ladies
Gastein Ladies
2009 in Austrian women's sport
July 2009 sports events in Europe
2009 in Austrian tennis